Enric Ismael Martín Panades (born 18 August 1980) is a Spanish track and field athlete and sighted guide.

Personal 
Martín was born on 18 August 1980 outside of Spain. He is from the Catalan region of Spain. In 2012, he lived in Barcelona.

Athletics 
At the 2006 Spanish indoor national championships, Martín finished third in the 200 meters with a time of 21.84.

From the Catalan region of Spain, Martín was a recipient a Plan ADO scholarship. Spain's 14 strong visually impaired athletics delegation to the London Games participated in a training camp at the Center for Sports Modernization in  La Rioja ahead of the Games. Martín competed at the 2012 Summer Paralympics as a guide for Xavier Porras.  Together, they competed in the  4x100 meters event, finishing fourth.  They also competed in the 100 meter event. In July 2013, he was Porras guide at the IPC Athletics World Championships.

References

External links 
 
 
 

1980 births
Paralympic athletes of Spain
Living people
Athletes (track and field) at the 2012 Summer Paralympics
Spanish sighted guides
Athletes from Catalonia
Athletes from Barcelona